In enzymology, a  (NADPH) is an enzyme that catalyzes the chemical reaction

trans-2,3-dehydroacyl-CoA + NADPH + H+  acyl-CoA + NADP+

This enzyme belongs to the family of oxidoreductases, specifically those acting on the CH-CH group of donor with NAD+ or NADP+ as acceptor.  The systematic name of this enzyme class is acyl-CoA:NADP+ trans-2-oxidoreductase. Other names in common use include NADPH-dependent trans-2-enoyl-CoA reductase, reductase, trans-enoyl coenzyme A, and trans-2-enoyl-CoA reductase (NADPH).  This enzyme participates in fatty acid elongation in mitochondria and polyunsaturated fatty acid biosynthesis.

References 

 

EC 1.3.1
NADPH-dependent enzymes
Enzymes of known structure